The 2007 season is Guangzhou FC's ninth consecutive year in Chinese Jia League.Guangzhou Pharmaceutical finished the first of the league and  promoted to China Super League.

First-team squad

Players

Technical staff

Transfers

In

Loan In

Out

Match results

Pre-season and friendlies

Chinese Jia League 2007

 Hohhot have withdrawn from the league. All matches were counted as 0–3 defeats.

References

External links
 Guangzhou Pharmaceutical F.C. official site 

Guangzhou Pharmaceutical F.C.
Guangzhou F.C. seasons